is a train station in Yamashina-ku ward, city of Kyoto, Kyoto Prefecture, Japan.

Lines

 (Station Number: T08)
 Keihan Electric Railway
 Keishin Line - Misasagi is the terminus of the line.

Layout

The station is a cross-platform interchange between the Tōzai Line and the Keihan Keishin Line, with two tracks and one island platform on both the second and third basement levels. The westbound platform (which is used for trains to Uzumasa Tenjingawa) is stacked above the eastbound platform (which is used for trains to Rokujizō and Hamaōtsu).
2nd basement

3rd basement

History
The station originally opened on 15 August 1912 as an at-grade railway station on the Keihan Keishin Line. On 12 October 1997, the at-grade station was replaced with an underground station when the first phase of the Tōzai Line opened.

Adjacent stations

References

Railway stations in Japan opened in 1997
Railway stations in Kyoto Prefecture
Stations of Keihan Electric Railway